Dhanunjayas may refer to: 

 Another name for Arjuna 
Dhananjaya Gotra